Avalanche, also marketed as Lawine in the Netherlands, Avalancha in Spain, and Astroslide or Skill  in Germany, is an abstract, mechanical strategy game published by Parker Brothers in 1966 that features colored marbles that roll down an inclined board.

Description
Avalanche is a board game for 2–6 players in which they roll marbles down an inclined plastic board, hitting gates that can either "open" or "close". If the marble hits a closed gate, it will stop. If it hits an open gate, it will continue but will change the direction of the gate from left to right or right to left. If a gate that was holding a marble changes direction, the marble will drop down its chute, possibly hitting other gates and potentially starting a chain reaction as those gate release other marbles.

Components
The game box contains 
 the board, which has a wooden support frame so that it can be inclined
 60 marbles in three colors
 6 square cardboard cards with nine punched holes to hold marbles. The holes are randomly colored with the three colors of the marbles, no two cards being alike.
 an instruction sheet.

Set up
The board is set up on an incline, and the gates are randomly set to the right or left. No gate can be left straight up and down. Each player receives one square card at random.

Basic game  
The first player takes any color of marble and drops it into any chute. The same player may continue to drop marbles down the chutes until one or more marbles drop all the way to the bottom of the board. When this happens, the active player's turn ends. That player picks up the marbles corresponding to the colored holes on their card (a green marble in a green hole, etc.), and the play passes to the next player.

Play continues until one player has completely filled their card with the correct colors of marbles, winning the game.

Standard game
The first player may play no more than five marbles, and their turn ends either after they have played five marbles, or as soon as one of the marbles reaches the bottom of the board. All subsequent players may play any number of marbles until at least one marble reaches the bottom of the board. If the player cannot place all the released marbles onto their card, the player retains the extra marbles and must use them on their next turn. The first player to fill up their card with the correct colors of marbles and have no marbles left over is the winner.

Expert rules 
In Expert Game I, the first player starts with eleven marbles, and all other players with seven marbles. The cards are not used. Each player plays all their marbles, with the object to get all of them to fall to the bottom. Any marbles that fall to the bottom are discarded, while the player takes any marbles left on the board and uses them on their next turn. The player who gets rid of all of their marbles first is the winner.

In Expert Game II, the players start with three marbles of each color (nine marbles). On their turn, each player collects the marbles that drop to the bottom of the board. The player who is holding only five marbles of one color at the end of their turn is the winner.

Publication history
Avalanche was designed by Frank W. Sinden and published by Parker Brothers in 1965 in North America as well as in Europe. In the early 1990s, Parker Brothers released a number of editions in various countries in Europe, including France (Avalanche, 1992), the Netherlands (Lawine, 1991), Spain (Avalancha, 1992), and Germany (Avalanche). In 2004, the German edition was retitled Astroslide.

Reception
Arno Steinwender, writing for the Austrian review site Spieletest called Avalanche "a nice action game that's mostly fun for kids. (Adults can easily figure out where the path is clear and blocked.) It's really fun to throw in marbles and see what happens!" 

Eric Mortensen, writing for Geeky Hobbies, commented, "If you successfully plan out your moves it is actually quite satisfying to see a lot of marbles that you need fall to the bottom at the same time." He also noted that a combination of strategy and luck was needed to win. Mortensen concluded, "Avalanche is the type of game that is fun in short doses. If played for extended periods of time, I think most people would get bored of the game. I see it more as the type of game that you play a couple of times every so often and then put away for a while." 

In A Gamut of Games, Sid Sackson identified Avalanche as a unique game because of its combination of equipment and manner of play, calling it "one of a kind."

In Issue 25 of Albion, game designer Don Turnbull called the design of Avalanche "a basic concept unique in gaming." He commented, "This is a fascinating game, and not at all easy, particularly in the harder version. It is also great fun for the kids, as nothing appeals more to the juvenile mind that to see a great avalanche of marbles hurtling down the board, accompanied by the cheers, or groans, of opponents." Turnbull concluded, "Try it – your family will be amused, and I think you will be intrigued."

Awards
At the 2004 Spiele der Spiele awards in Vienna, the Wiener Spiele Akademie awarded the German-language edition Astroslide the Spiele Hit für Familien (Best in Class in the category "For Families").

Other recognition
A copy of Avalanche is held in the collection of the Strong National Museum of Play (object 112.2929).

References

External links
 Avalanche at Board Game Geek

Abstract strategy games
Board games introduced in 1966
Parker Brothers games